The 2014 Mississippi Valley State Delta Devils football team represented Mississippi Valley State University in the 2014 NCAA Division I FCS football season. The Delta Devils were led by first year head coach Rick Comegy and played their home games at Rice–Totten Field. They were a member of the East Division of the Southwestern Athletic Conference (SWAC). They finished the season 2–9, 1–8 in SWAC play to finish in last place in the East Division.

Schedule

References

Mississippi Valley State
Mississippi Valley State Delta Devils football seasons
Mississippi Valley State Delta Devils football